A Good Lad, is a 1942 Soviet musical film directed by Boris Barnet.

Plot 
The film tells about a pilot from France, who was shot down by the Germans and wound up in a partisan detachment.

Starring 
 Evgeniy Grigorev as Nevskiy (as E. Grigorev)
 O. Yakunina as Evdokia
 Ekaterina Sipavina as Katia (as Yelena Sipavina)
 Viktor Dobrovolsky as Claude
 Nikolay Bogolyubov as Doronine
 L. Tkachev as Ichoukine
 N. Stepanov as Vasya

References

External links 
 

1942 films
1940s Russian-language films
Soviet black-and-white films
Soviet musical films
1942 musical films